Thomas Francis Tennant (July 3, 1882 – February 15, 1955) was a professional baseball player. In an 11-season minor league career, he had 1,825 hits and a .274 batting average. He also played two games in Major League Baseball in 1912. Tennant was 5 feet, 11 inches tall and weighed 165 pounds.

Career
Tennant was born in Monroe, Wisconsin, in 1882. At some point, his family moved to Elgin, Illinois.  Playing mostly as a first baseman, he started his professional baseball career in 1906 with the Wisconsin State League's Green Bay Colts. That season, he batted .313 and led the league with 141 hits. Tennant then moved on to the Illinois–Indiana–Iowa League, where he played for the Decatur Commodores for two seasons. He batted just .261 in 1907 but raised his average to .310 in 1908 and once again topped the circuit in hits, with 164.

Tennant spent 1909 through 1911 with the San Francisco Seals of the class A Pacific Coast League. In 1910, he had 231 hits in 223 games to lead his league in hits for the third time. Then in April 1912, Tennant broke into the major leagues with the St. Louis Browns. He appeared in two games for them that month as a pinch hitter and went 0 for 2 at the plate with 1 run scored. The Browns had used eight first basemen in 1911 but traded for veteran standout George Stovall from the Cleveland Indians in the off-season.  A St. Louis newspaper commented that Tennant "had the goods, but he came just one year late to land the regular job". The rest of the 1912 season, he played for the Western League's Sioux City Packers.

In 1913, Tennant returned to the Pacific Coast League, displacing Hughie Miller as the starting first baseman for the Sacramento Solons. He batted .299 with a league-leading 47 doubles in his first year back, but his statistics declined after that. He retired from professional baseball after the 1916 season.

Tennant died in San Carlos, California, in 1955 and was buried in Holy Cross Cemetery.

References

External links

1882 births
1955 deaths
St. Louis Browns players
Decatur Commodores players
San Francisco Seals (baseball) players
Sioux City Packers players
Sacramento Sacts players
Salt Lake City Bees players
Evansville Evas players
Memphis Chickasaws players
Northern Illinois Huskies baseball players
Mobile Sea Gulls players
Baseball players from California
Baseball players from Wisconsin
People from Monroe, Wisconsin
People from San Carlos, California